Ballif is a surname. Notable people with the surname include:

Algie Eggertsen Ballif (1896–1984), American educational leader and politician
Bonnie Ballif-Spanvill, American academic
Claude Ballif (1924–2004), French composer
George S. Ballif (1894–1977), American Mormon missionary and lawyer
Jae R. Ballif (born 1931), American university administrator